Heliamphora heterodoxa ( = other, doxa = opinion, belief) is a species of marsh pitcher plant native to Venezuela and adjacent Guyana. It was first discovered in 1944 on the slopes interlinking Ptari-tepui and Sororopan-tepui and formally described in 1951.

This Heliamphora is closely related to H. glabra and the latter was for a long time considered a form of H. heterodoxa. It is one of four Heliamphora taxa formally described by Julian A. Steyermark.

Heliamphora heterodoxa is known to tolerate slightly higher temperatures compared to other Heliamphora species, due to its habitats being located in upland wetlands and lower elevation Pantepui habitats (approx. 1200m - 1500m a.s.l.). The plant grows vigorously and exhibits a large, overhanging nectar spoon.

Etymology 
The name "heterodoxa", meaning "variable",  was given to the species by J.A. Steyermark who had observed that "considerable variation occurs within this species". An expedition to the locus classicus of H. heterodoxa on the southwestern slopes of Ptari-tepui undertaken in May 2018 confirmed occurrences of one other species of Heliamphora, H. collina, as well as a H. collina x purpurascens hybrid swarm being present at the very same location.

Infraspecific taxa
Heliamphora heterodoxa var. exappendiculata Maguire & Steyerm. (1978) [=H. exappendiculata]
Heliamphora heterodoxa var. exappendiculata f. glabella Steyerm. (1984) [=H. minor]
Heliamphora heterodoxa var. glabra Maguire (1978) [=H. glabra]
Heliamphora heterodoxa f. glabra (Maguire) Steyerm. (1984) [=H. glabra]

References

Further reading

 Barrera, R., D. Fish & C.E. Machado-Allison (1989). Ecological patterns of aquatic insect communities in two Heliamphora pitcher-plant species of the Venezuelan highlands. Ecotropicos 2(1): 31–44. 
 Carow, T., A. Wistuba & P. Harbarth (March 2005). Heliamphora sarracenioides, a new species of Heliamphora (Sarraceniaceae) from Venezuela. Carnivorous Plant Newsletter 34(1): 4–6.
  Fleischmann, A. & J.R. Grande Allende 2012 ['2011']. Taxonomía de Heliamphora minor Gleason (Sarraceniaceae) del Auyán-tepui, incluyendo una nueva variedad. [Taxonomy of Heliamphora minor Gleason (Sarraceniaceae) from Auyán-tepui, including a new variety.] Acta Botánica Venezuelica 34(1): 1–11.
 Jaffé, K., M.S. Blum, H.M. Fales, R.T. Mason & A. Cabrera (1995). On insect attractants from pitcher plants of the genus Heliamphora (Sarraceniaceae). Journal of Chemical Ecology 21(3): 379–384.  
 Nerz, J. (December 2004). Heliamphora elongata (Sarraceniaceae), a new species from Ilu-Tepui. Carnivorous Plant Newsletter 33(4): 111–116.
 Nerz, J. & A. Wistuba (June 2006). Heliamphora exappendiculata, a clearly distinct species with unique characteristics. Carnivorous Plant Newsletter 35(2): 43–51.
 McPherson, S. 2007. Pitcher Plants of the Americas. The McDonald & Woodward Publishing Company, Blacksburg, Virginia.
 Wistuba, A., P. Harbarth & T. Carow (December 2001). Heliamphora folliculata, a new species of Heliamphora (Sarraceniaceae) from the ‘Los Testigos’ table mountains in the south of Venezuela. Carnivorous Plant Newsletter 30(4): 120–125.
 Wistuba, A., T. Carow & P. Harbarth (September 2002). Heliamphora chimantensis, a new species of Heliamphora (Sarraceniaceae) from the ‘Macizo de Chimanta’ in the south of Venezuela. Carnivorous Plant Newsletter 31(3): 78–82.
  Wistuba, A., T. Carow, P. Harbarth, & J. Nerz (2005).  Das Taublatt 53(3): 42–50.

heterodoxa
Flora of Venezuela
Plants described in 1951
Flora of the Tepuis